John A. Aitken ( – 13 July 1917) was a Scottish professional footballer who played in the Scottish Football League for Hibernian.

Personal life
Aitken served as a lance corporal in the Gordon Highlanders during the First World War. Deployed to the Western Front in February 1915, he was killed in action at Ypres on 13 July 1917. Aitken is buried at Vlamertinge New Military Cemetery.

Career statistics

References

1894 births
Year of birth uncertain
Date of birth missing
1917 deaths
Association footballers not categorized by position
Scottish Football League players
Hibernian F.C. players
Broxburn United F.C. players
British Army personnel of World War I
Gordon Highlanders soldiers
British military personnel killed in World War I
Scottish footballers